"Mama Said" is a country rock ballad by American heavy metal band Metallica from their sixth album, Load, with music and lyrics by James Hetfield (music credited to Hetfield/Ulrich). The lyrics represent a man or boy who is learning to find his own way in life away from his mother. The song is directly written about Hetfield's difficult relationship with his mother, who died of cancer when he was 16 years old.

The song is a departure from the band's classic sound; its genre-blending style incorporates country, blues, and hard rock. "Mama Said" begins with acoustic guitar and, during the chorus, becomes flush with a country-flavored vocal harmony and steel guitar. Toward the end, the song features power chords on electric guitar.

"Mama Said" has never been featured as a part of Metallica's live setlist. Hetfield has performed this song live, however, using a single steel-stringed acoustic guitar with no drum or bass accompaniment. He also performed it along with country singer Jessi Colter on CMT's Outlaw Concert, along with Hetfield's cover of Waylon Jennings's "Don't You Think This Outlaw Bit's Done Got Out of Hand."

Demo
An early demo version is also entitled "Mama Said (The Story So Far)" which was recorded in Lars Ulrich's home musical studio "Dungeon" on April 14, 1995.

Music video
Lesser known among Metallica's music video catalog, the "Mama Said" video focuses on James Hetfield sitting in the backseat of a car while playing the song on an acoustic guitar. The vehicle appears to be driving along a Southwestern highway, and at one point the other members of Metallica are seen outside looking into the window. As the song comes to an end, the view pulls back to reveal that Hetfield has been sitting in a stationary backseat inside a studio. He then walks over to a horse, takes its bridle, and walks off screen. It was filmed in November 1996 in London, England and directed by Anton Corbijn.

Track listing
International single part 1 
"Mama Said" - 5:19
"King Nothing (Live - Irvine Meadows, California 4 August 1996)" - 6:50
"Whiplash (Live - Irvine Meadows, California 4 August 1996)" - 4:52
"Mama Said (Edit)" - 4:34

International single part 2 
"Mama Said" - 5:19
"So What (Live - Irvine Meadows, California 4 August 1996)" - 3:00
"Creeping Death (Live - Irvine Meadows, California 4 August 1996)" - 7:15
"Mama Said (Early Demo Version)" - 6:52

International 7" vinyl single 
"Mama Said" - 5:19
"Ain't My Bitch (Live - Irvine Meadows, California 4 August 1996)" - 5:59

Australian maxi single
"Mama Said (Edit)" - 4:34 	
"Mama Said (Early Demo Version)" - 6:52

UK promo single
"Mama Said (Edit)" - 4:43 	
"Mama Said" - 5:19

Japanese EP 
"Mama Said (Edit)" - 4:42
"So What (Live - Irvine Meadows, California 4 August 1996)" - 2:58
"Creeping Death (Live - Irvine Meadows, California 4 August 1996)" - 7:14
"King Nothing (Live - Irvine Meadows, California 4 August 1996)" - 6:51
"Whiplash (Live - Irvine Meadows, California 4 August 1996)" - 6:01
"Mama Said (Early Demo Version)" - 6:53

References

1990s ballads
1996 singles
Metallica songs
Music videos directed by Anton Corbijn
Songs written by James Hetfield
Songs written by Lars Ulrich
Song recordings produced by Bob Rock
1996 songs
Blues rock songs
Country rock songs
Southern rock songs
Songs about cancer